Liu Ji may refer to:

Emperor Gaozu of Han (256 BC – 195 BC), courtesy name Liu Ji
Liu Ji (Three Kingdoms) (185–233), Eastern Wu politician in the Three Kingdoms period
Liu Ji (Tang chancellor) (died 646), Tang dynasty chancellor
Liu Ji (general) (757–810), Tang dynasty general
Liu Bowen (1311–1375), military strategist, statesman and poet of the late Yuan and early Ming dynasties
 (1427–1493), Ming dynasty mandarin
Liu Ji (politician) (1887–1967), General and Politician in the Republic of China
Liu Ji (footballer) (born 1990), Chinese footballer
Ji Liu (pianist) (born 1990), U.K.-based Chinese pianist